Mont Sutton is a ski area in the Eastern Townships located within the town of Sutton, Quebec, Canada, about 5 km directly east of its urban district. In 1960, the hill was turned into a downhill ski centre by the Boulanger family.  Known for its glades skiing, today it operates 9 lifts with an 11,800 person/hour capacity and hosts a terrain park.

See also
List of ski areas and resorts in Canada

References

Ski areas and resorts in Quebec
Geography of Montérégie
Tourist attractions in Montérégie
Brome-Missisquoi Regional County Municipality